In Hebrew morphology, the paragogic nun (from paragoge 'addition at the end of a word') is a nun letter added at the end of certain verb forms, without changing the general meaning of the conjugation. Its function is debated and may involve a modal change to the meaning of the verb.

Occurrences 
It occurs most commonly in the plural 2nd and 3rd persons of imperfect forms.

It is a common phenomenon, appearing 106 times in the Pentateuch, but has unequal distribution: 58 occurrences in Deuteronomy, none in Leviticus.

Explanation 
The general meaning of the verb form is not altered by the added nun, and grammarians have proposed various explanations for the phenomenon: an archaism preserved as a matter of style, a syntactic or phonological rule that is not consistently applied because of hypercorrection, etc.

Recent inquiries suggest that the paragogic nun conveys the dependent quality of a subordinate statement, whether the subordinate has a modal function (purposive, obligation/permission, temporal), as in the following sentence where the nun conjugation does not appear in the first verb, and does appear in the next verbs conjugated in the same tense and persons:«  » (Deut 5:33)

« In this way ... you shall walk main clause: regular conjugation 'go' without nun , so that you may live subordinate clause: 'live' and 'possess' with nun  ... in the land which you shall possess » or:«  » (Gen 3:3)

« nor shall you touchregular conjugation it, lest you dieconjugation with final nun »or, in a simple temporal clause, as in the following sentence where the same verb in the same tense and person receives the nun inside the clause, and does not outside the clause:«  » (Ex 3:21)

« and when you go subordinate clause: 'go' with nun , you shall not go empty main clause: regular conjugation 'go' without nun  »However, some instances are difficult to explain, which is why some researchers mention the randomness or stylistic quality of the phenomenon: it does not appear in Ex. 4:8  but does appear in the next verse, which has almost identical meaning and structure: Ex. 4:9 .

Other languages 
In Phoenician Arabic and Aramaic, contrary to Hebrew, the imperfect forms in plural 2nd and 3rd persons always display the final nun. Removing this final nun creates the jussive modal forms, in Phoenician and in Aramaic, In Classical Arabic the forms without "nun" are used also for the subjunctive. So that a similar modal shift between the forms with and without final nun may explain the phenomenon in Hebrew.

References

Hebrew grammar